Preston Bierce Plumb (October 12, 1837December 20, 1891) was a United States senator from Kansas, as well as an officer in the Union Army during the American Civil War.

Biography
Born in Delaware County, Ohio, at 9 his family removed to Marysville, Ohio, where he flourished in the local schools.  At 11 he attended Kenyon College, a preparatory school and learned the trade of printing.  After 3 years there, he returned to Marysville where he worked for the local paper, The Tribune, and afterwards purchased and edited the Xenia News.

He moved to Lawrence, Kansas in 1856, to support the "Free-State" movement. He was one of the founders of Emporia, Kansas, where he established the Kansas News in 1857. He was secretary of the Free-State convention in 1857 and a member of the Leavenworth constitutional convention in 1859. Plumb studied law and was admitted to the bar in 1861. He was elected to the Kansas House of Representatives in 1862 and was a reporter for the Kansas Supreme Court.

During the Civil War, Plumb entered the Union Army in 1862 as a second lieutenant in the 11th Kansas Infantry, which was redesignated as the 11th Kansas Cavalry in August 1863 in Kansas City. He served successively as captain, major, and lieutenant colonel of the regiment. He was on duty on the eastern border of Kansas until October 1864, helping fight pro-Confederacy Missouri partisans and raiders under William Quantrill, as well as serving in Nebraska against Indians. Starting in October, Plumb and his regiment fought against the Confederates in several battles during Price's Raid. He was mustered out September 26, 1865.

He was a member of the State House of Representatives in 1867 and 1868, and also served as speaker in the latter year. He was prosecuting attorney of Lyon County and was president of the Emporia National Bank in 1873.

In 1877, Preston Plumb was elected as a Republican to the U.S. Senate; he was reelected in 1883 and 1888 and served from March 4, 1877, until his death. While in the Senate, he was chairman of the Committee on Public Lands (Forty-seventh through Fifty-second Congresses). He died in Washington, D.C., in 1891, and was buried in Maplewood Cemetery in Emporia.

In popular culture
The lead character in the popular 1890 play The Senator was modeled after Plumb.

See also
List of United States Congress members who died in office (1790–1899)

Notes

References

1837 births
1891 deaths
People from Delaware County, Ohio
American newspaper editors
Kenyon College alumni
Republican Party members of the Kansas House of Representatives
Union Army officers
People of Kansas in the American Civil War
Republican Party United States senators from Kansas
People from Emporia, Kansas
19th-century American journalists
American male journalists
19th-century American male writers
19th-century American politicians
Journalists from Ohio
People from Marysville, Ohio